Hopeman railway station served the village of Hopeman, Moray, Scotland from 1892 to 1957 on the Highland Railway's branch line from .

History 
The station opened on 10 October 1892 by the Highland Railway.  The station closed to passengers on 14 September 1931 and completely on 30 December 1957. Between 1 January 1917 and 2 June 1919 passenger services, except school services, had been withdrawn as a wartime measure.

Despite being closed to passengers the station was host to a LMS camping coach in 1935 and 1936 followed by three camping coaches from 1937 to 1939.

References

External links 

Disused railway stations in Moray
Former Highland Railway stations
Railway stations in Great Britain opened in 1892
Railway stations in Great Britain closed in 1917
Railway stations in Great Britain opened in 1919
Railway stations in Great Britain closed in 1931
1892 establishments in Scotland
1957 disestablishments in Scotland